Passport is the debut studio album from South African DJ duo Pascal & Pearce. It was released on the 5th of September 2011, by South African independent record label Just Music. In South Africa, it was released as a limited edition physical double disc CD, disc 2 being a collection of remixes done by the duo. It was nominated in the Best Dance Album category in the 2012 South African Music Awards.

Track listing

Awards and nominations

Personnel
Pascal & Pearce – primary artist
Pascal Ellinas – producer, engineer, primary artist
Dave Pearce – producer, engineer, primary artist
Michelle Breeze – vocalist
Greg Carlin – vocalist
Mawuli Kulego – vocalist
Juliet Harding – vocalist
Rueben Botha – vocalist
Andrew Chaplin – vocalist
Brian Chaplin – vocalist
Tamara Dey – vocalist
Yoav Sadan – vocalist
Louise Carver – vocalist

References

Pascal & Pearce albums
2011 debut albums